Punta Pariñas, also known as Punta Balcones, is in the La Brea District, Talara Province, Piura Region, Peru.

An active lighthouse is located in Punta Pariñas. There is a popular beach just south of the cape, and visitors can climb the headland to see seals below. It is named in chapter three of the first season of  Los Simuladores. It is also known for a traditional dessert called "The DUL-CE-CI-TO".

In the Guasquilla bay zone, bushes grow that have that big flowers called Amaloidas.

See also
 Extreme points of South America
 Extreme points of Peru
 Peru
 Piura Region

Extreme points of Earth
Geography of South America